Hoghmik is a village in the Amasia Municipality of the Shirak Province of Armenia.

Demographics
The population of the village since 1831 is as follows:

References 

Populated places in Shirak Province